Mariquita Jenny Moberly , née Phillips, (2 November 1855 – 1 November 1937) was an English artist, working in oil paints and watercolours.

Biography
Moberly was born on 2 November 1855 to John Phillips and Jane Atkins Phillips at Deptford in London. Her name, mariquita, (literally, "Little Mary") means ladybird in Spanish.

Moberly studied in Germany and under Carolus-Duran in Paris. She painted portraits, figure studies, animals and landscapes in oils, watercolours and pastels. Moberly exhibited at the Royal Academy in London, with the New Watercolour Society and at both the Royal Hibernian Academy and the Royal West of England Academy in Bristol. She lived in Epsom, and later Mitcham.

In March 2013, a number of her watercolour paintings, in private possession, of a variety of subjects, were shown in the BBC television programme Antiques Roadshow. These included a 1918 self-portrait and a picture of a dog that reputedly belonged to Ernest Shackleton, along with photographs of her paintings of dogs known to be his.

Her works are in a number of public collections, including The Secret Path in the Russell-Cotes Art Gallery & Museum.

She died in Mitcham, Surrey, on 1 November 1937, one day before her 82nd birthday.

References

External links

 

1855 births
1937 deaths
19th-century English women artists
20th-century English women artists
19th-century English painters
20th-century English painters
English watercolourists
English women painters
Ernest Shackleton
Painters from London
People from Epsom
People from Mitcham
People from Deptford